In the redistribution of land among the Ernestine duchies that followed the death of the last Duke of Saxe-Gotha-Altenburg on 11 February 1825, the late Duke's nephew-in-law, Duke Ernst III of Saxe-Coburg-Saalfeld, received Gotha, while he ceded Saalfeld to the Duke of Saxe-Meiningen. On 12 November 1826 he thus became Ernst I of Saxe-Coburg and Gotha. The duchies of Saxe-Coburg and Saxe-Gotha remained in personal union until 1852, when a political union was effected.

This article is a list of those men who were heir-apparent or heir-presumptive to Saxe-Coburg and Gotha from 1826 until the abolition of the monarchy on 14 November 1918.

Heir to Ernest I, 1826–1844

Heirs to Ernest II, 1844–1893

Heirs to Alfred I, 1893–1900

Heirs to Charles Edward I, 1900–1918

Sources
 http://www.heraldica.org/topics/royalty/HGSachsen-CG.htm

Saxe-Coburg and Gotha